This list includes the shortest ever verified people in their lifetime or profession. The entries below are broken down into different categories which range from sex, to age group and occupations. Most of the sourcing is done by Guinness World Records which in the last decade has added new categories for "mobile" and "non-mobile" men and women. The world's shortest verified man is Chandra Bahadur Dangi, while for women Pauline Musters holds the record.

Men

Women

Shortest pairs

Shortest by age group

This was Nisa's baby height, she later grew.
This was Francis Joseph Flynn's shortest height, because he grew in height after age 16; he is not listed as one of the world's shortest men.
Filed under "Shortest woman to give birth".

Shortest by occupation

Actors

Artists and writers

Athletes

Politicians

Others

See also
 Dwarfism
 Pygmy peoples
 Little people (mythology)
 List of dwarfism organisations
 Dwarfs and pygmies in ancient Egypt
 List of tallest people

References

External links

Human height
Shortest People
Shortest People
Shortest